Kaarepere railway station is a historic railway station located in the village of Kaarepere in eastern Estonia. The station is served by trains heading to Tallinn and Tartu operated by Elron

The station is listed as a heritage building by the Estonian government's Muinsuskaitseamet (Estonian National Heritage Board), number 23960. Construction on the building was finished in 1927. A parking lot was added next to the station in 2011.

See also
 List of railway stations in Estonia
 Rail transport in Estonia

References

External links

 Official website of Eesti Raudtee (EVR) – the national railway infrastructure company of Estonia  responsible for maintenance and traffic control of most of the Estonian railway network
 Official website of Elron – the national passenger train operating company of Estonia responsible for all domestic passenger train services in Estonia

Railway stations in Estonia
Railway stations opened in 1927
Buildings and structures in Jõgeva County
Jõgeva Parish